Micryletta erythropoda, commonly known as the Mada paddy frog, is a species of frog in the family Microhylidae.
It is known from Myanmar, Thailand, and Vietnam.
Its natural habitats are swamps, freshwater marshes, and intermittent freshwater marshes. While formerly classified in the genus Microhyla, a 2018 study found it to belong to the genus Micryletta instead. A study performed in 2019 found that several Micryletta populations in southern Myanmar and Thailand that were formerly assigned to M. inornata actually belong to M. erythropoda; prior to this, M. erythropoda was considered endemic to Vietnam.

References

Sources
 
 Tarkhnishvili, D.N., 1994. Amphibian communities of the Southern Viet Nam: Preliminary data. - Journal of Bengal Natural History Society,  New Series. 13(1): 3-62.

Micryletta
Amphibians of Vietnam
Amphibians of Myanmar
Amphibians of Thailand
Taxonomy articles created by Polbot